Nicolaas Beets (13 September 1814 – 13 March 1903) was a Dutch theologian, writer and poet. He published also under the pseudonym Hildebrand.

Life
Nicolaas Beets was born in Haarlem, the son of a pharmacist. From 1833 till 1839 he studied theology at the university of Leiden where he received his doctorate.

In 1840 he became a minister at the Dutch Reformed Church in Heemstede. In the same year he married Aleida van Foreest. In 1848 he became correspondent of the Royal Institute of the Netherlands, when that became the Royal Netherlands Academy of Arts and Sciences in 1851 he joined as member. In 1854 he moved to Utrecht where from 1874 till 1884 he was a professor in church history at the University of Utrecht.

He wrote prose, poetry and sermons. As a poet, Beets came under the influence of Byronism.

His most famous work is Camera Obscura, which he wrote under his pseudonym during his student years. Of his poems, "De moerbeitoppen ruischten" is well-known and popular; it is heavily anthologized, and even called "immortal" by one critic.

The archive of Nicolaas Beets is available at Leiden University Library and digitally accessible through Digital Collections.

Personal life

In 1840 he married Aleida van Foreest, granddaughter of Johannes Hendricus van der Palm, with whom he had 9 children. In 1859 he remarried with Jacoba Elisabeth, a sister of Aleida, with whom he had another 6 children. Beets had a sister, Dora Beets, who was also a writer.

Beets died of a brain haemorrhage at age 88, in Utrecht.

References

Attribution

External links

 
 
 
 
 Works by Nicolaas Beets (Dutch texts) on DBNL

1814 births
1903 deaths
Dutch male novelists
Dutch male poets
Dutch Calvinist and Reformed theologians
19th-century Calvinist and Reformed theologians
Writers from Haarlem
Leiden University alumni
Academic staff of Utrecht University
Commanders of the Order of the Netherlands Lion
Members of the Royal Netherlands Academy of Arts and Sciences
19th-century poets
19th-century Dutch novelists
19th-century Dutch male writers